An excessive heat warning is a notice issued by the National Weather Service of the United States within 12 hours of the heat index reaching one of two criteria levels.

Note that local offices, particularly those where excessive heat is less frequent or in areas with deserts or mountainous terrain, often have their own criteria. High values of the heat index are caused by temperatures being significantly above normal and high humidity, and such high levels can pose a threat to human life through conditions such as heat stroke, heat exhaustion, and other heat-related illnesses.

Danger to athletes
Due to the extreme illnesses that can occur, athletes should limit their physical activity when an excessive-heat warning is issued.  According to the National High-School Sports-Related Injury-Surveillance System, High-School RIO, an estimated number of 51,943 excessive-heat illnesses occurred in nine of the high-school sports observed between 2005, 2011, and 2020.

Example
The following is an example of an excessive heat warning issued by the National Weather Service office in San Antonio, Texas on June 11, 2022 during a severe heat wave.

692
WWUS74 KEWX 111801
NPWEWX

URGENT - WEATHER MESSAGE
National Weather Service Austin/San Antonio TX
101 PM CDT Sat Jun 11 2022

TXZ171>173-191>193-203>208-219>222-120900-
/O.UPG.KEWX.HT.Y.0005.000000T0000Z-220613T0000Z/
/O.NEW.KEWX.EH.W.0001.220611T1801Z-220613T0000Z/
Llano-Burnet-Williamson-Hays-Travis-Bastrop-Uvalde-Medina-Bexar-
Comal-Guadalupe-Caldwell-Frio-Atascosa-Wilson-Karnes-
Including the cities of Llano, Burnet, Georgetown, San Marcos,
Austin, Bastrop, Uvalde, Hondo, San Antonio, New Braunfels,
Seguin, Lockhart, Pearsall, Pleasanton, Floresville,
and Karnes City
101 PM CDT Sat Jun 11 2022

...EXCESSIVE HEAT WARNING IN EFFECT UNTIL 7 PM CDT SUNDAY...

* WHAT...Air temperatures ranging from 103 to 107, as well as heat
  index values up to 105 to 110 expected.

* WHERE...Portions of south central Texas.

* WHEN...Until 7 PM CDT Sunday.

* IMPACTS...Extreme heat and humidity will significantly
  increase the potential for heat related illnesses,
  particularly for those working or participating in outdoor
  activities.

PRECAUTIONARY/PREPAREDNESS ACTIONS...

Drink plenty of fluids, stay in an air-conditioned room, stay out
of the sun, and check up on relatives and neighbors. Young
children and pets should never be left unattended in vehicles
under any circumstances.

Take extra precautions if you work or spend time outside. When
possible reschedule strenuous activities to early morning or
evening. Know the signs and symptoms of heat exhaustion and heat
stroke. Wear lightweight and loose fitting clothing when
possible. To reduce risk during outdoor work, the Occupational
Safety and Health Administration recommends scheduling frequent
rest breaks in shaded or air conditioned environments. Anyone
overcome by heat should be moved to a cool and shaded location.
Heat stroke is an emergency! Call 9 1 1.

&&

$$

See also 

 Extreme cold warning – the polar opposite of an Excessive heat warning

References

External links
 National Weather Service

Weather warnings and advisories